This is a list of events from British radio in 1930.

Events
8 March – Last day of broadcast for 5GB Daventry, the BBC's experimental National Programme which has been running on a scheduled basis since 21 August 1927; it is replaced by the National Programme Daventry.
9 March – First day of broadcast for the BBC's new National and Regional Programmes, which gradually replace the existing call-signed regional radio stations. 9 May sees three new stations broadcast: the National Programme (aka National Programme Daventry, replacing station 5XX), the Regional Programme London (replacing 2LO) and the Regional Programme Midlands. The BBC also opens its second high-power medium-wave transmitter at Brookmans Park, north of London.
18 April – BBC radio listeners uniquely hear the announcement "Good evening. Today is Good Friday. There is no news." Piano music follows.
28 May – The BBC Symphony Orchestra is formed as a permanent full-scale ensemble under the directorship  of Adrian Boult. It gives its first concert on 22 October at the Queen's Hall, London.
14 June–19 July – The Scoop, a serial written by members of the Detection Club, is broadcast on the BBC National Programme.
12 October – First day of broadcast of the National Programme London, providing better reception for the south of England than is available from Daventry.
Elsie and Doris Waters introduce the radio comedy characters Gert and Daisy.

Births
 6 February – Lionel Blue, reform rabbi and broadcaster (died 2016)
 7 February – Peter Jones, Welsh-born sports commentator (died 1990)
 7 April – Cliff Morgan, Welsh rugby union player, sports commentator and broadcasting executive (died 2013)
 4 June – Edward Kelsey, actor (died 2019)
 17 July – Ray Galton, comedy scriptwriter (died 2018)

References 

 
Years in British radio
Radio